Mustafa Miftah Bel'id al-Dersi is a Libyan politician who currently served as Secretary of the General People's Committee of Libya for Youth and Sports.

See also
General People's Committee of Libya

References

External links
GPCO Website

General People's Committee For Youth and Sports - Libya Homepage

Members of the General People's Committee of Libya
Living people
Year of birth missing (living people)
Place of birth missing (living people)